The Melting Man is a 1968 thriller novel by the British Victor Canning. It is the fourth and final entry in a series novels about Rex Carver, a private detective drawn back into his old profession of espionage. It features the French secret agent Aristide de la Dole, who had previously appeared in Doubled in Diamonds.

Synopsis
Carver is hired by the millionaire Cavan O’Dowda to recover his missing Mercedes which has disappeared somewhere between Evian and Cannes with crucial documents inside.

References

Bibliography
 Burton, Alan. Historical Dictionary of British Spy Fiction. Rowman & Littlefield, 2016.
Murphy, Bruce F. The Encyclopedia of Murder and Mystery. Springer, 1999.
 Reilly, John M. Twentieth Century Crime & Mystery Writers. Springer, 2015.

1968 British novels
British spy novels
British thriller novels
Novels by Victor Canning
Novels set in London
Novels set in France
Heinemann (publisher) books